Ann Marie Di Mambro (born 18 June 1950) is a Scottish playwright and television screenwriter of Italian extraction. Her theatre plays have been performed widely; they are also published individually and in collections and are studied in schools for the Scottish curriculum's Higher Drama and English.

Biography 
Di Mambro studied at Glasgow University, Girton College, Cambridge, and Bolton College of Education, before becoming a teacher. She gave up teaching to write for theatre. Her plays have been performed in Scotland's main theatres as well as touring to other venues across Scotland. From 1989 to 1990, she was the Thames Television Resident Playwright at the Traverse Theatre in Edinburgh. She has been commissioned to write plays by the Traverse Theatre and by Cumbernauld Theatre. She won the Susan Smith Blackburn Prize for 1994-5.

In addition to theatre plays, she writes drama for British radio and British television. These included multiple episodes of the BBC's popular continuing dramas: Doctors, River City, EastEnders and Casualty.

Machair
Di Mambro was also screenwriter on the first ever long-running Gaelic drama television serial Machair created by Peter May and Janice Hally.  Along with Hally, Di Mambro wrote scripts in English before they were translated into Gaelic.  Fewer than 2% of the Scottish population are able to speak Gaelic but the show achieved a 30% audience share, making it into the Top Ten of programmes viewed in Scotland. Machair was nominated for production and writing awards at The Celtic Film Festival and by Writers Guild of Great Britain

Theatre plays
 Hocus Pocus (1986) Annexe Theatre Company, Glasgow
 Joe (1987) Traverse Theatre, Edinburgh
 Dixon's Has Blasted (1987) Mayfest, Glasgow
 Sheila (1988) Traverse Theatre, Edinburgh
 Visible Differences (1988) TAG, Theatre About Glasgow
 Long Story Short (1989) 7:84 Theatre Company (touring company), Scotland
 The Letter Box (1989) Sabhal Mòr Ostaig, Isle of Skye
 Tally's Blood (1990) Traverse Theatre, Edinburgh
 Scotland Matters (1992) 7:84 Theatre Company (touring company), Scotland
 Brothers of Thunder (1998) published in "Scotland Plays" Nick Hern Books, London, 1998
 Ae Fond Kiss (2007) Assembly Rooms, Edinburgh

Filmography
Dramarama (1987-1988)
Winners and Losers (1989)
Take the High Road (1988 - 1995, also script editor)
Doctor Finlay (1993-1996)
Pie in the Sky (1997)
Hope and Glory (Series 2, episode 2) (2000)
Taggart (2002)
The Inspector Lynley Mysteries (2004)
Casualty (1995-2007)
EastEnders (2003-2011)
Doctors (2014)
Eve (2015)
The Coroner (2015-2016)
River City (2007-2011, 2022)

References

External links
 Cambridge University Press Cambridge Companion to Modern British Women Playwrights Editors, Elaine Austin and Janelle Reinelt.

Ann Marie Di Mambro – complete guide to the Playwright and Plays 
Article in East Kilbride News
Article in The Scotsman newspaper
Article in The Sunday Herald
Article in The Times of London online
 Review in The Scotsman

1950 births
Living people
Alumni of Girton College, Cambridge
British television writers
British women dramatists and playwrights
Writers from Glasgow
Scottish dramatists and playwrights
Scottish television writers
Scottish women writers
British women television writers